Asura flavida is a moth of the family Erebidae. It is found on the Solomon Islands.

References

flavida
Moths described in 1887
Moths of Oceania